Alan Thornett (born 15 June 1937) is a British Trotskyist.

Alan Thornett began his career as a car worker in Plant Oxford, Cowley, Oxford in 1959.  He joined the Communist Party of Great Britain there in 1960 before being recruited with other shop stewards to Gerry Healy's then Socialist Labour League in 1966. However, in 1974 he and most of the Cowley group were expelled - from what had become the Workers Revolutionary Party the previous year - with around 200 other members. Around a hundred of them went on to form the Workers Socialist League (WSL) of which Thornett was a leader. It established an international tendency, the Trotskyist International Liaison Committee, and fused with the International-Communist League in 1981.  Political differences emerged in the new organisation with parts of the ex-WSL splitting off before those remaining were expelled in 1984.

Thornett and his comrades regrouped as the Socialist Group and then fused with the International Group to form the International Socialist Group (ISG) in 1987; the ISG dissolved into Socialist Resistance in 2009. Thornett is now a leader of the Fourth International.

Thornett successfully argued for the ISG to exit the Labour Party and join the Socialist Alliance. Later, he supported the Alliance's dissolution in favour of the Respect Coalition. In the 2007 split in Respect, the ISG sided with the Respect Renewal faction around George Galloway against the SWP. Thornett sat on Respect's National Council until Socialist Resistance left Respect in 2010.

Thornett is the author of three volumes of autobiography: From Militancy to Marxism, Inside Cowley and Militant Years, and of Facing the Apocalypse - Arguments for Ecosocialism

References

External links
"Debate on The European Radical Left A reply to Alex Callinicos". Article by Thornett contrasting the ISG's approach to Respect to the SWP's.
"Building Respect, how we get beyond the current stage". Article by Thornett critically assessing how to move Respect Coalition forwards.
Catalogue of Thornett's papers, held at the Modern Records Centre, University of Warwick

1937 births
Communist Party of Great Britain members
Ecosocialists
English Trotskyists
Living people
Respect Party people
Workers Revolutionary Party (UK) members
British political party founders